The Golden Threshold is an off-campus annexe of University of Hyderabad. It is named after the renowned Indian poet and political leader Sarojini Naidu's eponymous first collection of poems.

The building was the residence of Sarojini Naidu's father Aghornath Chattopadhyay, the first Principal of Hyderabad College now Nizam College. During the Chattopadhyay family's residence, it was the centre of many reformist ideas in Hyderabad, in areas ranging from marriage, education, women's empowerment, literature and nationalism. Specifically, the reformist ideas included more power for women in a time where politics in India, especially regional politics, was dominated by men. It also included ideas for involvement for women in the arts field. There were also many restrictions on marriage during this time period that persist to this day, such as inter-regional and inter-caste marriages. These ideas were progressive for the era, but brought a change in India in slow ways over time. 

Golden Threshold was named after Sarojini Naidu's very first collection of poetry published in 1905.  It now houses Sarojini Naidu School of Arts & Communication of University of Hyderabad.

References

Tourist attractions in Telangana
University of Hyderabad
Museums in Hyderabad, India
Educational institutions in India with year of establishment missing
Sarojini Naidu